George Power may refer to:

 Sir George Power, 7th Baronet (1846–1928), operatic tenor
 George Power (cricketer) (1849–1904), English cricketer
 George Power (priest) (died 1950), Dean of Ardfert, 1918–1924